The criminal justice system of France, or the French legal system, is derived from Roman law. It is not only a feudal system in the Middle Age, but also a representative of the civil law system. France is committed to the judicial system which was gradually established after the French Revolution in the late 18th century. From beginning of the 19th century to nowadays, Napoleon codified a series of significant rules and established the common court system, administrative court system as well as independent judicial system which formed a unified modern judicial system.

History 

From the late Middle Ages to the early Renaissance, the earliest commence of in modern French criminal law were marked by the Templar trial which took place in the early 1300s as well as the trial of Jeanne d' Arc over a hundred years later. Although the former was an instant medieval legal trial, obviously, the medieval-nowadays evolution of modern law was reflected in the latter's proceedings. In addition, France was witnessing an evolution in its criminal justice system, which was responded with a string of jury trials from the French Revolution to the 20th century, with the overall inquisitorial commitments of the ecclesiastical courts of the 13th century. Under this criminal justice system, individuals are in fact deprived of their rights and can be put into uninformed investigation or even being subjected to cruel torture and interrogation. As a result, since the late 18th century, the criticism on this inquisitorial system has been increasingly growing fiercely intensified. After the French Revolution in 1789 the Declaration of the Rights of Man and of the Citizen established principles that would become significant for later legal developments. Eventually, 1808 witnessed the establishment of the Code of Criminal Procedure in the litigation mode of separated prosecution and trial. After the end of World War II, the judicial committee brought out the amended version of the Code of Criminal Procedure, thus bringing the procedure into judicature.

Judicial organization

Cour de Cassation 

The French Cour de Cassation works as the final court of appeal for civil and criminal cases. As a judicial court, it cannot hear those cases including protesting against the government. Such cases usually fall within the scope of the administrative court, and the State Council acts as the highest court of appeal. The court was founded in the Tribunal de cassation in 1790 during the Revolution in France, which was built to have a review court which was used to amend the jurisdiction of the lower-level local privileged court. The court is made up of a judge, the Prosecutor's office and the Administrative Office of Courts. The judge of the Cour de Cassation is composed of the premier president, first presidents of the chambers, justice conseillers and assistant judge conseillers referendaries. Judges are appointed by the president of the republic on the recommendations of the high judicial council. The chief justice works as the highest judicial officer and shall be responsible for the court's executive branch as well as the discipline of the judges.

Tribunal de police 

The tribunal de police consists of a single judge but the court is constituted by a prosecutor and a recording officer. Generally, there are five categories that violate the rules. The tribunal de police hear class five contraventions separately from one to four contraventions, with the fine ranging from 250 francs to 10,000 francs. In addition, after the trial of the tribunal de police, provided that the suspect refuses to accept the judgements of the court, the suspect can appeal to French Cour d' Appeal.

Tribunal correctionnel 

The tribunal correctionnel performs the duty as a court which addresses ordinary criminal cases and usually hears the crimes which ranges from two months to five years in prison or more than the fine of 10,000 francs. The tribunal correctionnel is set upi n the provincial capital of each province. Furthermore, those densely populated provinces are permitted to locate more than one tribunal correctionnel independently. The court usually comprises three judges and one recorder. Since 1973, the case of the accused's consent has been permitted to be heard by the judge alone.

Cour d' Assise 

Cour d’ Assises, which shoulders the responsibility of handling major criminal cases, usually hears cases of five years or more imprisonment, hard labor or death penalty. Cour d’Assise, which is located in the provincial capital of each province, whose name is based on the name of the province. The court exercises jurisdiction within the range of the province. In accordance to the French Criminal Procedure Law, the composition of Cour d’ Assise is made up of the court as well as the jury. The courts implement the judge on the basis of the Court of Appeal or the First Instance, which consists of three judges and nine jurors. Cour d' Assise, the only court in France that has a jury for a criminal case, harbours the combined composition of professional judge and non-professional juror. It is worth mentioning that it represents one of the biggest differences between tribunal de police and tribunal correctionnel. Moreover, the judgement made by Cour d' Assise cannot be appealed.

Criminal law 

France's criminal law is featured by its concept structure instead of its result. Distinguishing itself from some aspects of civil as well as public law, it is structured with rooted middle age in royal law but is now heavily influenced by international criminal and criminological trends, without being struck by sharp-cut influence by Roman law. The innovation of the penal code in 1994 made it possible to gain a modernized and systemised treatment to the corresponding issues. However, the revolution and Napoleonic history still exert a strongly far-reaching impact. The principle of legality requires , even if they lead to imprisonment. But laws and crimes must be the product of regulations. In addition, courts have issued notices immediately which are opposed to the enactment of criminal offences, even if they are merely supervisory offences.

Types of infraction 
French criminal law provides for three classes of infractions including crimes (major crimes; akin to serious felonies), délits (less serious felonies), and contraventions (petty offences such as driving infractions).

Criminal procedure 
Criminal procedure in France is regarded as mainly inquisitorial. And the operational process of French criminal justice is divided into three stages of pre-trial, trial and post-trial. The first procedure in the process of prosecuting a criminal for most crimes is an investigation by a pretrial judge. Different procedures are provided for the prosecution of each class of offence.

Before trial 
Before trial, a preliminary investigation conducted by a pretrial judge is a routine part of the judicial process. It transfers the case to the highly competent court on the basis of a reasonable estimation of what the accused criminals may be convicted of in the future. The criminal procedure in France requires early intervention by the examining magistrate. In most common law jurisdictions, any offence, except the most trivial, is tried by the same court

Cases can be initiated in two ways. If a petition is filed with a civil claim, the magistrate has the right to proceed with the investigation. If no claim for damages is provided against the complaint, it must be transferred to the local prosecutor. If the prosecutor determines to pursue the matter, the pretrial judge will be notified. Besides, the jurisdiction of the investigation is based on the initial application. Once the investigation has begun, the magistrate is free to investigate any violations related to the application and may proceed to further inquiry any person who may be involved.

Persons who are ordered to appear and offer evidence must do so. Any refusal to appear before the court is deemed as punishable by contempt of court. It is not necessary for the person being investigated to take an oath like other witnesses, on the premise of the person who has been investigated is capable of calling a lawyer for assistance. Witnesses other than the civil claimant cannot acquire the assistance of a lawyer unless they are advised to accept the investigation. In such cases, the trial judge must warn the witnesses in advance. As for the criminal proceedings, they shall be conducted in writing or made into a written record immediately afterwards, instead of presenting to public and likewise they are not adversary in form except in the extremely limited circumstances.

If the pretrial judge determines that the case should be prosecuted, the judge will make an order for transfer. And the following parts will be several various methods for addressing criminal behaviours. If the offence is regarded as a petty offence, the case will be referred to the police court. If it is deemed as a misdemeanor, it will be transferred to the appropriate lower court for trial. If the case involves a felony, it must first be referred to the district court of appeal for prosecution rather than directly to the court.

The trial court 
The court for tribunal de police is composed of one judge and hears the same case as for misdemeanours. Cases can be referred to such courts in several aspects. In the first place, when both the offender and the complainant appear voluntarily, it is possible that the case will be concluded in a quick manner. And the other is a complaint raised by the victim or the district attorney, which is the most common formula. After the court receives the complaint, it issues a direct summons order, which will be delivered to the defendant or the defendant's residence by the bailiff of the court. The defendant must be provided a time limit of not less than five days to appear in court.< For misdemeanours and police offences, the judge may conduct a final judgement in court.

The procedure of a felony is much more complicated than that of a misdemeanour. The felony court administers all cases referred to it by the district court of appeal, and hears merely such cases. The felony court is an institution peculiar to the French legal system. The jury as one of its constituent parts, holds a meeting quarterly, and the judgement of the felony court will not be appealed to the court of appeal. Once a final order for a trial is released, the defendant should be transferred to the prison where the felony court is located. Besides, any conviction must be upheld and supported by at least five members of the nine jurors. If the results of vote agree with the conviction, the judge will immediately vote on the sentence. The method of conviction is carried out based on the secret ballot in which each person proposes a penalty which must be imposed by a majority vote. Moreover, the approach of consecutive votes must be taken and performed until a penalty is confirmed. From the third round of voting, the most severe penalty was removed one by one from the proposed candidates.

Juvenile justice

The period of Paternal Power 
Until the 1789 revolution, the law conducted recognition about three age groups of children defined in Latin: infans (ages 0 to 7), proximus infanti (ages 7 to 10) and proximus pubertati (ages 10 to 14). For each age group, judges acted the way they considered as appropriate, and were free to reach great extremes in both punishment and forgiveness. And it was common to perform deliberate imprisonment of children by parents until the end of the seventeenth century. In addition, although criminal sentences are in principle no harsher for adolescents than for adults, the penal code allows for the implementation of life imprisonment, deportation and even the death penalty for children under the age of 7. During the period of the governance of Napoleon, fathers had the right to require civil courts to imprison their children for up to one month. Additionally for older children, the magistrate of the court owns the power to determine the time limit of imprisonment, but the maximum term is one month. According to the law in 1804, any father who was dissatisfied with the conduct of his child could petition the court of superior supervision to imprison the child. However, these laws also gradually began to restrict parents' right from implementing corporal punishment.

Juvenile criminal proceedings 
The purpose of establishing Juvenile court aims at the particularity of juvenile crime. In 1945, the basic criminal policy against crimes committed by minors was formulated, and special juvenile judges and juvenile courts were established respectively. Cases of minor offences against the first four grades of police offences are still addressed before the police courts, while cases against the fifth grade of police offences, misdemeanours and felonies are required to be tackled under the jurisdiction of the juvenile courts. The system includes several parts of juvenile judges, juvenile courts, appellate courts and juvenile felony courts.

These courts are presided by one juvenile court judge with two assistants of two lay judges and one court clerk. By virtues of the referral of a juvenile judge or pretrial judge, the juvenile court hears felony cases committed by minors under the age of 16 and misdemeanours committed by minors under the age of 18. The juvenile court may order for adopting measures of protection, assistance, supervision and education for all minors, and take educational sanctions against those minors over 10 years of age. Furthermore, minors who are at the age of 13 to 16 can be sentenced. However minors can only afford half of the sentences prescribed by adults. And they cannot be remanded unless they have committed a serious crime.

In terms of the judicial structure, the juvenile felony court shares the same construction system as the common felony court, which is composed of 3 professional judges and 9 jurors. The juvenile felony court hears felonies committed by minors between the ages of 16 and 18.

Works cited

References

External links 
 Academy of Criminal Justice Sciences
 Criminal justice

French criminal law
Government of France
Law enforcement in France